The Northern Local Supervoid is a region of space devoid of rich clusters of galaxies, known as a void. It is the closest supervoid and is located between the Virgo (Local), Coma and Hercules superclusters. On the sky, it is located between Boötes, Virgo, and Serpens Caput constellations. It contains a few small galaxies (primarily spirals) and galaxy clusters, but is mostly empty. The faint galaxies within this void divide the region into smaller voids, which are 3–10 times smaller than the supervoid.

See Also 
 KBC Void

References

Voids (astronomy)